The Botucatu Formation is an Aptian geologic formation of the Paraná and Pelotas Basins in southern Brazil and northern Uruguay. The formation is composed of quartzitic sandstones, deposited in an eolian environment. Fossil theropod tracks have been reported from the formation.

Description 
The sandstone is fine-textured and well sorted, containing no pebbles; its colour is occasionally white, yellowish, and reddish, but more commonly it is pinkish. Nearly always it is silicified and therefore compact and hard. The formation was deposited in an arid desert environment, characterized by sabkhas and wadis.

Fossil content 
Among the following fossils were reported from the Botucatu Formation:
 Coelurosauria indet.
 Lacertilia indet.
 Mammalia indet.
 Ornithopoda indet.
 Theropoda indet.
 Vespersaurus
 ?Tritylodontoidea indet.

Ichnofossils
 Brasilichnium elusivum

See also 
 List of dinosaur-bearing rock formations
 List of stratigraphic units with theropod tracks
 List of fossiliferous stratigraphic units in Uruguay
 Itapecuru Formation, contemporaneous fossiliferous formation of the São Luis and Parnaíba Basins
 Bahia Group, contemporaneous fossiliferous formation of the Recôncavo Basin
 Quiricó Formation, contemporaneous fossiliferous formation of the São Francisco Basin
 La Cruz Formation, contemporaneous fossiliferous formation of the Marayes-El Carrizal Basin, Argentina
 Rayoso Formation, contemporaneous fossiliferous formation of the Neuquén Basin, Argentina
 Cerro Barcino Formation, contemporaneous fossiliferous formation of the Cañadón Asfalto Basin, Argentina
 Río Belgrano Formation, contemporaneous fossiliferous formation of the Austral Basin, Argentina

References

Bibliography

Further reading 
 Leonardi, G. 1989. Inventory and statistics of the South American dinosaurian ichnofauna and its paleobiological interpretation. In D. D. Gillette & M. G. Lockley (ed.), Dinosaur Tracks and Traces 165–178.
 Leonardi, G. 1980. On the discovery of an abundant ichno-fauna (vertebrates and invertebrates) in the Botucatu Formation s.s. in Araraquara, São Paulo, Brazil. Anais da Academia Brasileira de Ciências 52(3):559-567 link.
 Leonardi,G., Carvalho, I.S., and Fernandes, M.A. 2007. The desert ichnofauna from Botucatu Formation (Upper Jurassic–Lower Cretaceous), Brazil. In: Carvalho, I.S., Cassab, R.C.T., Schwanke, C.,Carvalho, M.A., Fernandes, A.C.S., Rodrigues, M.A.C., Carvalho, M.S.S., Arai, M., and Oliveira, M.E.Q. (eds.). Paleontologia: Cenários da Vida, I. Interciência, Rio de Janeiro, Brazil. p, 372–383. link.

Geologic formations of Brazil
Geologic formations of Uruguay
Cretaceous Brazil
Cretaceous Uruguay
Aptian Stage
Sandstone formations
Aeolian deposits
Ichnofossiliferous formations
Reservoir rock formations
Formations
Fossiliferous stratigraphic units of South America
Paleontology in Brazil
Formations